Red cooking, also called Chinese stewing, red stewing, red braising, or flavor potting, is a slow braising Chinese cooking technique that imparts a reddish-brown coloration to the prepared food.

There are two types of red cooking:
Hongshao: can be done in less than 20 minutes and usually does not require much water
Lu: usually requires prolonged cooking of up to several hours and the items must be submerged in the cooking liquid.

Red cooking is popular throughout most of northern, eastern, and southeastern China. The name is derived from the dark red-brown coloration of the cooked items and its sauce.

Types

Soy sauce (usually a mix of light and dark soy sauce), fermented bean paste, red fermented tofu or rock sugar is commonly used to both flavor and impart a reddish brown hue to the items being cooked. Food coloring is sometimes added for a more intense red coloration. Both lu and hongshao are forms of stewing or braising characterized by usage of soy sauce, Chinese rice wine (Shaoxing wine, huangjiu etc.) and rock sugar. Whole spices (star anise, black cardamom (caoguo), cassia, and/or fennel seeds) or five-spice powder are crucial elements in these dishes but are used in moderation so that their flavors do not overwhelm the main ingredients.

Red-cooked stews may be heavy in meat content or contain a variety of meats, vegetables, and hard-boiled eggs. Such dishes may be served hot or cold, and the sauce or stock is often reused as master stock.

See also

 Ah-so sauce
 Char siu
 Fujian cuisine
 Hunan cuisine
 Jiangsu cuisine
 Kho (cooking technique)
 List of cooking techniques
 Shanghai cuisine
 Zhejiang cuisine

References

 Charmaine Solomon's Encyclopedia of Asian Food, Charmaine Solomon, 1998, Tuttle, 
 Chinese Cooking for Dummies, Martin Yan, 2000, For Dummies, 
 Martin Yan's Invitation to Chinese Cooking, Martin Yan, 2000, Bay Books, 
 Xiandai Hanyu Cidian (Modern Chinese Dictionary), Shang Wu Press, Beijing, 1996,

External links
 Article describing red cooking

Chinese cooking techniques
Chinese soups and stews